Smęcino  is a village in the administrative district of Gmina Tychowo, within Białogard County, West Pomeranian Voivodeship, in north-western Poland.

Notable residents
Ewald-Heinrich von Kleist-Schmenzin (1922-2013), German  resistance fighter and publisher

See also
History of Pomerania

References

Villages in Białogard County